Mosse may refer to:

Ethnic Groups
 Mossé of Burkina Faso

Medicine
 Bartholomew Mosse (1712-1759), Irish surgeon and founder of the Rotunda Hospital
 Markus Mosse (1808-1865), German physician

Literature
 Hans Lachmann-Mosse (1885-1944), German publisher
 Kate Mosse (b. 1961), English author and broadcaster
 Rudolf Mosse (1843-1920), German publisher and philanthropist

Other fields
 Albert Mosse (1846-1925), Prussian judge
 Anthony Mosse (b. 1964), standard bearer for New Zealand competitive swimming through the 1980s.
 George Mosse (1918-1999), German-born American left-wing Jewish historian of fascism
 Monsieur Mosse (1932-1992), Finnish make-up artist
 Store Mosse National Park, national park in Småland in southern Sweden

Surnames